Leslie Ann Goldberg  is a professor of computer science at the University of Oxford and a Fellow of St Edmund Hall, Oxford. Her research concerns the design and analysis of algorithms for random sampling and approximate combinatorial enumeration.

Education
Goldberg did her undergraduate studies at Rice University and completed her PhD at the University of Edinburgh in 1992 under the joint supervision of Mark Jerrum and Alistair Sinclair after she was awarded the Marshall Scholarship. Her dissertation, on algorithms for listing structures with polynomial delay, won the Distinguished Dissertations in Computer Science prize.

Career and research
Goldberg became the Head of Department for the Department of Computer Science, University of Oxford in October 2021.

Prior to working at Oxford, her employers have included Sandia National Laboratories, the University of Warwick, and the University of Liverpool.

Goldberg serves as editor-in-chief of the Journal of Discrete Algorithms, and has served as program chair of the algorithms track of the International Colloquium on Automata, Languages and Programming (ICALP) in 2008.

Awards and honours
She is a member of the Academia Europaea (MAE) and was awarded the Suffrage Science award in 2016.

References

Year of birth missing (living people)
Living people
American computer scientists
British computer scientists
British women computer scientists
Theoretical computer scientists
Rice University alumni
Academics of the University of Warwick
Academics of the University of Liverpool
Fellows of St Edmund Hall, Oxford
Members of Academia Europaea
Sandia National Laboratories people